This Thing of Ours is an American 2002 crime/drama film directed by Danny Provenzano and starring him alongside Frank Vincent, Edward Lynch, Vincent Pastore and James Caan. The title is a reference to the Italian term Cosa Nostra, "This Thing Of Ours", which refers to the American Mafia. Colombo crime family underboss, John Franzese, was an associate producer of the film.

The film garnered primarily negative reviews, earning a 40% score on Rotten Tomatoes and receiving a 36/100 on the review aggregator Metacritic, signifying generally unfavorable reviews.

Plot
Using the internet and old-school mafia traditions, a crew of young gangsters led by Nicholas "Nicky" Santini attempt to pull off the biggest heist in the history of the mafia. Nicky must first convince his uncle Danny Santini, a respected caporegime of the Genovesso crime family in New Jersey, to put up the necessary "seed money", $50 million. When Danny agrees, Nicky along his partner and friend Johnny "Irish" Kelly use violence and murder to put the plan in motion. But as much as things seem to be changing in the family's way of doing business, old habits and traditions remain and Nicholas must decide between his friends who helped him pull off the scam or his uncle Danny.

Cast
Danny Provenzano as Nicholas Santini
Frank Vincent as Danny Santini 
Edward Lynch as Johnny "Irish" Kelly
Vincent Pastore as Skippy
James Caan as Jimmy "The Con" 
Chuck Zito as Chuck 
Louis Vanaria as Austin Palermo
Christian Maelen as Robert Biaggio
Michael DelGaizo as Patsy DeGrazio
Pat Cooper as John Bruno 
Vinny Vella as Carmine
Joseph Rigano as Joe 
Tony Ray Rossi as Anthony Russo
Jonathan Doscher as Agent Clark
Melissa Bacelar as Secretary 
Gaetano LoGiudice as Tommy
John Speciale as Jimmy S.

References

External links 
 

2003 films
American crime drama films
2003 crime drama films
Films about the American Mafia
2000s English-language films
2000s American films